Margoth Muñoz de Burgos (died 22 September 2017) was a Salvadoran politician. She was a member of the Constituent Assembly from 1961 to 1964.

Biography
Muñoz contested the 1961 elections for the Constituent Assembly and was elected to the Assembly. She served in the Assemlby until 1964.

References

20th-century Salvadoran women politicians
20th-century Salvadoran politicians
Members of the Legislative Assembly of El Salvador
2017 deaths